Lowertown is a hamlet in the civil parish of Luxulyan, where the population in the 2011 census was included, in Cornwall, England.

References

Hamlets in Cornwall